Movva is the name of a well-known village in the Krishna district of the Indian state known as Andhra Pradesh. It is located in 'Movva mandal of Machilipatnam revenue division'. It is one of the villages in the mandal to be a part of Andhra Pradesh Capital Region.

It is the hometown of the famous 17th century Telugu poet Kshetrayya (c.1600-80). In fact, Kshetrayya was so much attached to his native village and the Krishna deity of the main temple here that his 'nom de plume' or signature, which appears towards the end of every poem written by him, is "Muvva Gopala."

The village is known for its government educational institutions such as SMK Zilla Parishad High School, Kshetrayya junior college, VSR Degree and PG college. The younger villagers have been migrating to United States and Australia Since 2001, during the IT boom of Andhra Pradesh. Kuchipudi, one of the villages in Movva Mandal is well known for the dance.

See also 
Villages in Movva mandal

References 

Villages in Krishna district
Mandal headquarters in Krishna district